Hunter is a city in Mitchell County, Kansas, United States.  As of the 2020 census, the population of the city was 51.

History
The first post office in Hunter was established in 1895. It was named for Al Hunter, an early settler. Hunter was incorporated in 1915.

Geography
Hunter is located at  (39.234632, -98.395944).

Climate
The climate in this area is characterized by hot, humid summers and generally mild to cool winters.  According to the Köppen Climate Classification system, Hunter has a humid subtropical climate, abbreviated "Cfa" on climate maps.

Demographics

2010 census
As of the census of 2010, there were 57 people, 33 households, and 15 families residing in the city. The racial makeup of the city was 98.2% White and 1.8% Native American. Hispanic or Latino of any race were 1.8% of the population.

There were 33 households, of which 15.2% had children under the age of 18 living with them, 36.4% were married couples living together, 6.1% had a female householder with no husband present, 3.0% had a male householder with no wife present, and 54.5% were non-families. 45.5% of all households were made up of individuals, and 30.3% had someone living alone who was 65 years of age or older. The average household size was 1.73 and the average family size was 2.33.

The median age in the city was 63.5 years. 14% of residents were under the age of 18; 5.4% were between the ages of 18 and 24; 14.1% were from 25 to 44; 17.6% were from 45 to 64; and 49.1% were 65 years of age or older. The gender makeup of the city was 43.9% male and 56.1% female.

2000 census
As of the census of 2000, there were 77 people, 41 households, and 23 families residing in the city. The racial makeup of the city was 98.70% White and 1.30% Native American.

There were 41 households, out of which 19.5% had children under the age of 18 living with them, 46.3% were married couples living together, 7.3% had a female householder with no husband present, and 43.9% were non-families. 43.9% of all households were made up of individuals, and 24.4% had someone living alone who was 65 years of age or older. The average household size was 1.88 and the average family size was 2.48.

In the city, the population was spread out, with 15.6% under the age of 18, 5.2% from 18 to 24, 18.2% from 25 to 44, 28.6% from 45 to 64, and 32.5% who were 65 years of age or older. The median age was 56 years. For every 100 females, there were 87.8 males. For every 100 females age 18 and over, there were 91.2 males.

The median income for a household in the city was $19,000, and the median income for a family was $27,708. Males had a median income of $15,625 versus $11,250 for females. The per capita income for the city was $13,424. There were no families and 5.3% of the population living below the poverty line, including no under eighteens and 7.1% of those over 64.

Education
The community is served by Sylvan–Lucas USD 299 public school district.

Hunter High School was established in 1917. Hunter, Sylvan Grove and Vesper schools united to form Sylvan Unified schools in 1966. In 2010, Sylvan unified with Lucas-Luray schools to form Sylvan-Lucas Unified.

The Hunter High School mascot was Hunter Huntsmen. Sylvan Unified as well as Sylvan-Lucas Unified mascot is the Mustangs.

References

Further reading

External links
 Hunter - Directory of Public Officials
 Hunter city map, KDOT

Cities in Kansas
Cities in Mitchell County, Kansas